The Rome Metro is a rapid transit system that operates in Rome, Italy. It started operation in 1955, making it the oldest in the country.

The original lines in the system, lines A and B, form an X shape with the lines intersecting at Termini station, the main train station in Rome.
Line B splits at the Bologna station into two branches.
The third line opened in 2014 and connects to the rest of the system through an interchange with Line A at San Giovanni.

Rome's local transport provider, ATAC, operates the Metro and several other rail services: the Roma–Giardinetti line and the Roma–Nord line. The Roma–Lido, which connects Rome to Ostia, on the sea, used to be operated by ATAC until 1st July 2022, when it became part of the Cotral network.

Lines

Line A

Line A runs from the southeastern suburbs of Rome, then along the northeast section of downtown, and then to the northern section of the city, near Vatican City. It connects with Line B, along with many other national and regional rail services, at Termini, and with Line C at San Giovanni. It has 27 stations, with terminals at Battistini and Anagnina. It is identified by the colour orange.

Line A was the second line built in Rome. Approval was given for the construction of the city's second Metro line in 1959.

Work on Line A began in 1964 in the Tuscolana area, but suffered a series of delays caused by poor organisation. Above all, the originally planned cut and cover method of construction posed serious problems for road traffic in southeast Rome. Work on the Metro was suspended and began again five years later, using bored tunnels, which partially resolved the traffic problems but caused numerous claims for compensation for vibrations caused by the machines. Work was also frequently interrupted by archaeological finds made during the excavations, particularly near Piazza della Repubblica.

Line A entered service in February 1980. In the late 1990s, it was extended from Ottaviano, in the Prati district, to Battistini to the west.

Since June 2022, Line A is connected with the reactivated railway station of Vigna Clara. The Vigna Clara-Valle Aurelia section is a relevant step to close the railway ring in North Rome because of the connection with the Line A, Line B (Ostiense) and the FL3 railway line to Viterbo.

Line B

Line B was the first Metro line in Rome. Line B connects the northeast of the city with the southwest. It has 26 stations with terminals at Rebibbia, Jonio and Laurentina (just east of EUR). It is identified by the colour blue. Transfers are available with Line A and other rail services at Termini station.

Line B was planned during the 1930s by the fascist government to provide a rapid connection between the main train station, Termini, and a new district to the southeast of the city, E42, the planned location of the Universal Exposition (or Expo), which was to be held in Rome in 1942. The exposition never took place due to Italy's entry into the Second World War in 1940. When its construction was interrupted, some of the tunnels on the city-centre side of the Metro (between Termini and Piramide) had already been completed, and they were used as air raid shelters during the war.

Work restarted in 1948, together with the development of the site formerly designated for the Expo into a residential and business district under the name EUR. The Metro was officially opened on 9 February 1955 by the then President of the Republic, Luigi Einaudi. Regular services began the following day.

In 1990, Line B was extended from Termini to Rebibbia in the east of the city and the entire line was modernised.

Line C

Opened on 9 November 2014, line C currently runs radially from San Giovanni, serving as an interchange station for Line A, to the eastern terminus of Pantano (the former terminus of the Roma–Giardinetti light railway). It is the first Metro line to extend beyond the city boundaries in Rome.

It is planned to extend to the northwest, towards Grottarossa (north of the Vatican), via the city centre; it will also intersect with Line A at Ottaviano (beside the Vatican), with Line B at Colosseo, and with the planned Line D at Piazza Venezia, thus creating a fourth Metro hub in Rome.

The first section of the line, from Centocelle to Pantano, is the furthest from the city centre and includes 15 of the planned 30 stops. A further  section of Line C, serving six additional stations, opened on 29 June 2015, as the line's western terminus was moved from Parco di Centocelle to Lodi. On 12 May 2018, the western terminus was moved to San Giovanni (interchange station for line A). After this third phase, the line will be further extended with two stations, Amba Aradam/Ipponio and Fori Imperiali/Colosseo, located in the city centre. A further extension to Piazza Venezia was announced by Mayor Virginia Raggi in July 2019.

Progress on the line has been slow with projected completion dates being repeatedly delayed. Rome is one of the oldest cities in the world, and as such, the construction of the Metro system has encountered considerable obstacles owing to frequent archaeological discoveries. While the excavation of the tunnels themselves can be undertaken well below the probable location of most archaeological finds, the excavation of stairwells and ventilation shafts – which must, by necessity, connect with the surface – pose considerable difficulties.

The trains operating on line C are completely automated, and use the same AnsaldoBreda Driverless Metro system also featured on the Copenhagen Metro.

Archeostation
During the excavation for the central route of line C, thanks to the archeological richness of Rome's ground a new type of underground station was born, as in Paris with Louvre–Rivoli station.

San Giovanni
San Giovanni station was the first archeostation to be opened on 12 May 2018. Excavation to a depth of about 20 metres allowed the exploration of about 21 stratifications of history up to the so-called virgin soil, the one in which man's presence is absent.

The exhibition is characterized by being a real tour with libraries for the finds along the route, explanatory panels on the walls and a temporal measurement of the historical phases that follows the path of the passengers from the atrium level to the platforms' level:

 Atrium level: from Contemporary Age to Late Antiquity Age
 First underground level: from Republican Age to Archaic Age
 Platform level: Prehistoric Age

The various archaeological finds and exhibits include small items such as gold jewelry, coins, crockery, shells, large amphorae and elements of ancient columns and also large finds, such as the large pool, the largest reservoir ever found, located inside a farm of the imperial age.

Timeline

Network map

Service

Fares
An urban single journey ticket, the Biglietto Integrato a Tempo (BIT), costs €1.50, and is valid on the Metro, buses, trams and suburban trains inside the Rome municipality for 100 minutes from first validation. Other tickets are available, including daily (€7.00), 2-day (€12.50), and 3-day (€18.00) passes (Rome 24h/48h/72h), and a weekly pass (€24.00), the Carta Integrata Settimanale (CIS). Monthly passes that are valid during the charged calendar month for unlimited journeys available for the personal usage (€35.00) or impersonal usage (€53.00) and may be used alternatively by different persons.  Children under 10 years old travel can travel for free on public transport services when accompanied by a fare-paying adult.

Two proximity cards are available in Rome, èRoma and Metrebus Card Red, which can be charged with season tickets, replacing paper for this type of ticket.

Operating hours
Service starts at about 5:30 am and ends at about 11:30 pm. On Fridays and Saturdays service ends later, at about 1:30 am.

When the Metro is closed, a night bus service operates with lines that follow the same routes and stop at the same stations as the Metro. Line A is served by bus NMA, Line B is served by bus NMB/NMB1, and Line C is served by bus N28.

Other rail lines operated by ATAC

Roma–Lido

Construction of the Roma–Lido line began shortly after the end of World War I and was completed some six years later in 1924. It began operation as a steam locomotion railway but electrification was completed less than a year later.

The line is operated as an integrated part of the Metro, but runs entirely overground. It runs from the Roma Porta San Paolo station beside the Line B Piramide station and runs alongside Line B as far as EUR Magliana. It then continues separately on to the seaside district of Ostia. The line terminates beside the end of Via Cristoforo Colombo.

Roma–Giardinetti

Officially termed a railway, the Roma–Giardinetti line is a narrow gauge tram which connects Laziali (a smaller, local train station some 800 metres east of Termini's main concourse) with Giardinetti, just past the Grande Raccordo Anulare (GRA) – Rome's orbital motorway. Most recently also the part from Centocelle to Giardinetti was reduced.

Roma–Civita Castellana–Viterbo

The Roma–Civita Castellana–Viterbo line (also called Roma Nord railway) began life as a narrow-gauge tram running from Piazza della Libertà in Rome to Civita Castellana. However, the next stretch of the line, to Viterbo, was built as a railway and over the years the tram section was converted into a railway as well, a process which concluded with the moving of the Roman terminus from the street-level terminus at Piazza della Libertà across the river to a new underground station in Piazzale Flaminio, beside the subsequently constructed Line A station, after World War II.

The line is operated in two modes: as an urban service from Piazzale Flaminio to Montebello, and as a suburban service from Piazzale Flaminio to Viterbo. The urban service operates with a frequency of about one train every ten minutes, while the suburban service operates considerably less frequently, with less than a third of the trains making the full two-and-a-half–hour journey from Rome to Viterbo.

Future expansions
The Metro system is currently expanding:
 An extension of line A from Battistini to Torrevecchia towards the west of the city is planned; a track of 2 kilometres (1.2 mi) with 2 stations.
 An extension of line B is also planned. A track of 2.8 kilometres (1.7 mi) with 2 stations should be realized from Rebibbia (Rome Metro) to Torraccia/Casal Monastero, towards the east of Rome. The extension of the line B1 is extending from Jonio to Bufalotta with 3.8 kilometers with 3 stations.
 The extension of line C towards the centre of Rome is under construction. From San Giovanni (interchange station with line A) to Grottarossa (Rome Metro) , the track is 3.6 kilometres (2.2 mi) long with an intermediate station near San Giovanni Addolorata Hospital, Amba Aradam.

New lines

There are two proposed new lines. There are no timelines yet for their construction. Line D would be a completely new line linking Ojetti and Agricoltura; while line E would see the existing Rome–Lido railway extended from its Porta S. Paolo terminus to Piramide using the existing Line B infrastructure.

Signalling

Signalling of the Rome Metro guarantees trains' safe and correct movements.

Line A
Line A uses an evolution of the RS4 Codici, a classical block system of the Italian railway. Since its creation the signalling offers to the conductor advice about the speed limit and the freedom of the way.

Line B
Until 1990, Line B used a railway-like signaling system that advised only about the freedom of the way.

Since 1990, the line uses a new signaling system, inspired by the Milan Metro's signaling, that gives information about the speed limit in the section within a range of 0 km/h and 80 km/h. Conductors are informed by classical light semaphores.

Line C
Line C is an automatic line and uses a radio frequency system for communication with the train. It has an electrical block system that permits a max frequency of a train every 90 seconds.

See also
 List of Rome Metro stations
 Lazio regional railways
 2006 Rome Metro crash
 List of metro systems

Notes

References

External links

 The Public transport company of the city of Rome
 Planned underground and suburban lines on 1986 (archived version)
 Roma Metropolitane – public transportation website 
 Martin G. Conde, ROME – IMPERIAL FORA. The Velia Hill:  Metro 'C' Archaeological Surveys (2006–2007). S10 (b1, b2, b3). (2006–2007)
 Rome interactive metro map

 
Metropolitan City of Rome Capital
Tourism in Rome
1955 establishments in Italy
Railway lines opened in 1955